Mirwais Neeka Institute of Higher Education is a private higher education institution located in Kandahar Province, Afghanistan. The Mirwais Neeka Institute of Higher Education was named after Mirwais Hotak, former Emir of Afghanistan. Students can apply for three faculties like 1. Law and International Relations, 2. Faculty of Economics, and 3. Medical Faculty.

History 
Mirwais Neeka Institute of Higher Education has been established by the Department of Private Universities and Institutions of the Ministry of Higher Education in accordance with the provisions of Article (46) of the Constitution, Chronological number(53), Registered number(536) on (12/Jan/2012). It started operating in Kandahar as a higher, scientific, educational institution with an official license and registration.

Currently (3213) active students in four faculties are being taught in (85) classes by (81) professional instructors. This amount has been increased twice. It has teaching hospitals, laboratories, and legal clinics for student training. According to the evaluation of the Quality and Accreditation Department of the Ministry of Higher Education, it has conducted the second phase of evaluation and has provided (1386) professional cadres to the community.

References

Kandahar
Private universities in Afghanistan

2011 establishments in Afghanistan
 Educational institutions established in 2011